The Boma Plateau is a region in the east of South Sudan, located in the Jonglei and Eastern Equatoria provinces. It is inhabited by the Anuak, Murle and Toposa peoples. It contains important wetlands for birdlife in the region. Wildlife is threatened by overgrazing by cattle, and by overhunting by local tribes with firearms.

Within it, Boma National Park (2,280,000 ha) was established in 1977.

The Boma Plateau is also one of the few places in the world where wild Coffea arabica grows.

It is contiguous with the Ethiopian Highlands.

References

Plateaus of Africa
Landforms of South Sudan
Ethiopian Highlands